Darge is a surname. Notable people with the surname include:

Darge Sahle Selassie, son of Negus Sahle Selassie of Shewa by a concubine
Kassa Haile Darge (1881–1956), Shewan nobleman, the son of Haile Wolde Kiros of Lasta and Tisseme Darge
Keb Darge, Scottish DJ of the genres of Northern Soul and Deep Funk music, and is possibly the best-known DJ of such genres
Rory Darge, Scotland international rugby union player
Tisseme Darge, daughter of Ras Darge Sahle Selassie, Prince of Selale
Tsehaiwork Darge, daughter of Ras Darge Sahle Selassie, Prince of Selale